The Innuitian orogeny, sometimes called the Ellesmere orogeny, was a major tectonic (mountain building) episode responsible for the formation of a series of mountain ranges in the Canadian Arctic and Northernmost Greenland. The episode started with the earliest Paleozoic rifting, extending from Ellesmere Island to Melville Island. However, the cause of the orogen remains poorly understood.

See also
Innuitian Mountains
Roosevelt Range

References

External links
Geological Regions: Innuitian orogen 

Paleozoic orogenies
Geology of the Northwest Territories
Geology of Nunavut
Geology of Greenland